Joachim Teege (November 30, 1925 – November 19, 1969) was a German actor.

Selected filmography
 The Adventures of Fridolin (1948) - Heini Bock
 Und wieder 48 (1948) - Reisender
 The Staircase (1950) - Herbert Ehrke
 The Merry Wives of Windsor (1950) - Mr. Spärlich
 Kommen Sie am Ersten (1951) - Charlie Stein
 The Dubarry (1951) - Alphonse Meyer, Fotograf
 Big City Secret (1952) - Fritz Möller
 I Lost My Heart in Heidelberg (1952) - Heinrich, Konditor
 Knall and Fall as Detectives (1953) - Dr. Klarwein
 Hocuspocus (1953) - Zeuge Eunano
 The Flower of Hawaii (1953) - Otto-Heinz
 Hochzeit auf Reisen (1953) - Junger Anwalt
 The Little Town Will Go to Sleep (1954)
 I Know What I'm Living For (1955)
 Three Days Confined to Barracks (1955) - Standesamtdiener Storch
 Der Frontgockel (1955) - Schindlbeck
 If We All Were Angels (1956) - Amtsanwalt
 The Miracle of Father Malachia (1961) - Cinema Owner
 Hocuspocus (1966) - Zeuge Munio Eunano
 The Hunchback of Soho (1966) - Lawyer Harold Stone
 Liselotte of the Palatinate (1966) - Abbé
 How to Seduce a Playboy (1966) - Emile
 Das Rasthaus der grausamen Puppen (1967)
 Rocket to the Moon (1967) - Bulgeroff
 Glorious Times at the Spessart Inn (1967) - Hugo
 Zum Teufel mit der Penne (1968) - Dr. Burki
  (1969, TV miniseries) - Heinrich Kühn

External links

1925 births
1969 deaths
People from Spremberg
People from the Province of Brandenburg
German male film actors
German male television actors
20th-century German male actors